Harazé Airport  is a public use airport located near Harazé, Salamat, Chad.

See also
List of airports in Chad

References

External links 
 Airport record for Harazé Airport at Landings.com

Airports in Chad
Salamat Region